Early and Medieval Chinese History, in Chinese《早期中國史研究》, abbreviated EMCH, is a Chinese-language academic journal on the study of Ancient and Medieval China, published by the Society of Early and Medieval Chinese History, (Taipei, Taiwan).

History
In 2009, some members of the Studies Group of Medieval Chinese History at National Taiwan University (NTU), led by Li-hsin Chao of National Chi Nan University, joined to form a new academic community. The EMCH is one of their principal endeavors.

Members of the Early and Medieval Chinese History Society include scholars from Taiwan, Mainland China, Japan, and Canada, such as, among others, Huaichen Kan, chairman of the history department at NTU, Taipei, Taiwan; Yukinobu Abe, professor at the Fine Liberal Art College, Chuuoun University, Tokyo, Japan; Albert Dien, emeritus professor, Stanford University, U.S.; Joshui Chen, Dean in the College of Fine Liberal Art, NTU, Taipei, Taiwan; and Guangda Zhang, academician, Academia Sinica, Taipei, Taiwan.  The official website is designed and run by Chung-cheng Tu of National Cheng-kung University, Tainan, Taiwan.

Articles in the journal include theses, research notes, discussions, book reviews, and up-to-date information about academic activities in Taiwan, China, and Japan.

The editors-in-chief for the first volumes: Zongxian Tsai of National Chung Hsing University, Taichung, Taiwan (2009); Yun-jo Lin of Tunghai University, Taichung, Taiwan (2010); Li-hsin Chao of National Chi Nan University, Puli, Taiwan (2011); Zhaoyi Lee of Chaoyang University of Technology, Taichung, Taiwan (2012); An-tai Wang of National Taiwan University, Taipei, Taiwan (2013); Wan-jun Wang of Soochow University, Suzhou, China (2014); Chung-cheng Tu of National Cheng Kung University, Tainan, Taiwan (2015); Ya-ju Cheng of the Institute of History and Philology, Academia Sinica, Taipei, Taiwan (2016); K'ai-Hsiang Hsu of National Chi Nan University, Nantou, Taiwan (2017); Chao-yi Lee of Chung Chen University, Chiayi, Taiwan (2018); Ya-ju Cheng of the Institute of History and Philology, Academia Sinica, Taipei, Taiwan (2019); Li-hsin Chao of National Chi Nan University, Nantou, Taiwan (2020); Yun-jo Lin of Chaoyang University of Technology, Taichung, Taiwan(2021), and Xiu-an Wu of the Institute of History and Philology, Academia Sinica, Taipei, Taiwan (2022).

ISSN

References
〈發刊辭〉，趙立新、蔡宗憲，《早期中國史研究》第1卷（2009.7）。
National Central Library, Taipei, Taiwan 臺灣期刊論文索引系統：《早期中國史研究》，2009-12-22。
「早期中國史研究會成立」．Academic News, Dep. of History, National Taiwan University 臺灣大學歷史學系．學界學術消息，2009-11-5。
「台湾《早期中国史研究》创刊」，往复论坛，2009-11-17。
『早期中国史研究』，關尾史郎のブログ:2011年05月。
「拝受 早期中国史研究 第1巻」，Marginal Notes & Marginalia，2009年12月2日。

Link
EMCH: The society of Early and Medieval Chinese History
EMCH早期中國史研究會

Publications established in 2009
History journals
Historiography of China